John Allen Hill (born May 20, 1931) was an American politician in the state of Florida.

Hill was born in Miami in 1931 and attended Miami Dade Junior College. An insurance executive, he served in the Florida State Senate from 1979 to 1988, as a member of the Democratic Party (33rd district).

References

1931 births
Living people
Businesspeople from Miami
Politicians from Miami
Democratic Party members of the Florida House of Representatives